The H. D. Abrams House, a Free Classic style house located at 403 N. Church St. in Aztec, New Mexico, was built in c.1906.  It was listed on the National Register of Historic Places in 1985.

It was built by H.D. Abrams, whose family moved to a  homestead in Aztec in 1904.  The property included artifacts and ruins.  Abrams supported protection of the ruins and the site eventually became the Aztec Ruins National Monument in 1923.  Abrams served on the town's board, on its school board, and as mayor.

References

Houses on the National Register of Historic Places in New Mexico
Houses completed in 1906
San Juan County, New Mexico
1906 establishments in New Mexico Territory